William Thornton (born February 15, 1986) is a former professional Canadian football wide receiver. He played college football at Texas A&M-Commerce, and played for the Hamilton Tiger-Cats of the Canadian Football League (CFL) in 2010.

College career
Thornton played college football at Texas A&M-Commerce. On September 20, 2008, he caught  seven passes for 266 yards in a 38-14 win against Eastern New Mexico. Thornton also had four touchdown catches in the game, including one for 98 yards on the opening play. As a result, he was named Lone Star Conference North player of the week. As a senior, Thornton caught 48 passes for 923 yards and 10 touchdowns.

Professional career
Thornton was a member of the Edmonton Eskimos during training camp in 2009.

Thornton signed with the Hamilton Tiger-Cats on May 26, 2010, but he was sustained torn thumb ligaments during a collision with another player in training camp. He was released on June 8, 2010. He was signed to the team's practice roster on September 8, 2010, and released on September 29. He was re-signed to the practice roster on October 11. He was promoted to the active roster on November 4, and played in the team's November 6 game against the BC Lions.  He was released by the Tiger-Cats in April 2011.

References

External links
JustSportsStats statistics

1986 births
Living people
People from Belle Glade, Florida
Sportspeople from the Miami metropolitan area
American players of Canadian football
Canadian football wide receivers
American football wide receivers
Edmonton Elks players
Hamilton Tiger-Cats players
Players of American football from Florida
Texas A&M–Commerce Lions football players